Aphelenchoides parietinus is a plant pathogenic nematode.

References

External links 
 Nemaplex, University of California - Aphelenchoides

Agricultural pest nematodes
parietinus